Michelle Renaud (born Michelle Renaud Ruesga; September 9, 1988) is a Mexican actress.

Early life 
Renaud debut was as a child in 1992 telenovela Ángeles sin paraíso. In 2004 returned to the telenovela Rebelde, she played "Michelle Pineda". In 2009 she played in the telenovela Camaleones with Belinda and Alfonso Herrera. The next years she played in the telenovelas Llena de Amor, Ni Contigo Ni Sin Ti and La Mujer del Vendaval.

In 2014 she played as special appearance in the telenovela El Color de la Pasión. Later that year, she made her own protagonist debut in the 2014 and then she starred in the telenovela La sombra del pasado with Pablo Lyle.

Filmography

Awards and nominations

TVyNovelas Awards

References

External links

1988 births
Living people
Mexican telenovela actresses
Mexican television actresses
Actresses from Mexico City
People from Mexico City
Mexican people of French descent